is a railway station in the city of Morioka, Iwate Prefecture, Japan, operated by the East Japan Railway Company (JR East).

Lines
Iwate-Iioka Station is served by the Tōhoku Main Line, and is located 529.6 rail kilometers from the terminus of the line at Tokyo Station.

Station layout
The station has two opposed side platforms connected to the station building by a footbridge.  The station has a Midori no Madoguchi staffed ticket office.

Platforms

History
Iwate-Iioka Station was opened on 1 September 1950. The station was absorbed into the JR East network upon the privatization of the Japanese National Railways (JNR) on 1 April 1987.

Passenger statistics
In fiscal 2018, the station was used by an average of 2,391 passengers daily (boarding passengers only).

Surrounding area
former Tonan Village Hall
Morioka Tonan Cultural Center
Morioka Tonan City Library

See also
 List of Railway Stations in Japan

References

External links

  

Railway stations in Iwate Prefecture
Tōhoku Main Line
Railway stations in Japan opened in 1950
Morioka, Iwate
Stations of East Japan Railway Company